Pádraig Power (born 2001) is an Irish hurler who plays as a forward for club side Blarney and at inter-county level with the Cork senior hurling team.

Career

Power first came to prominence at juvenile and underage levels with the Blarney club before joining the club's adult team in 2019. He scored 1-02 when the club beat Castlelyons to win the 2021 Cork PIHC title. Power first appeared on the inter-county scene on the Cork minor hurling team in 2018. He spent three years with the Cork under-20 hurling team and won two consecutive All-Ireland Under-20 Championships from three consecutive final appearances. Power joined the Cork senior hurling team in advance of the 2022 National League.

Career statistics

Club

Inter-county

Honours

Blarney
Cork Premier Intermediate Hurling Championship: 2020

Cork
 All-Ireland Under-20 Hurling Championship: 2020, 2021
 Munster Under-20 Hurling Championship : 2020, 2021

References

2001 births
Living people
Blarney hurlers
Cork inter-county hurlers